Grammodes congenita  is a moth of the  family Noctuidae. It is found in Africa, including South Africa, Eswatini and Madagascar.

Foodplants of the larvae of this species are Cistus salvifolius, Rubus sp., Smilax sp. and Polygonum sp.. This species also figures on a $100 stamp of Cabo Verde from 1999.

References

Ophiusina
Moths described in 1858
Moths of Cape Verde
Moths of Africa
Moths of Madagascar
Moths of the Middle East